Al-Ahjur is a sub-district located in the Shar'ab as-Salam District, Taiz Governorate, Yemen. Al-Ahjur had a population of 5856 according to the 2004 census.

Villages
al-Rahbuh village. 
al-Mashaqib village.
Shajjaf village.
al-Ribat village.
Al-Kidah village.
al-Hida village.
al-Wadi village.
al-Dawamiu village.
al-Wa'shah village.
al-Qahaf Al-adyabe village.

References

Sub-districts in Shar'ab as-Salam District